Bavaria Slavica is a historiographic term used to denote the areas populated by West Slavic people (Wends) between the 6th and the 12th centuries in northeastern Bavaria. The Wends settled in Bavaria in several waves between the 6th and the 9th centuries and then in the 10th and the 11th centuries. The settlement of loyal West Slavic Wends and other minor tribes was favoured under Frankish Emperor Charlemagne. Later, the East Frankish Empire also settled largely-Christianized Wends in regions that were rural or unpopulated or threatened by uprisings. After the migration had ended, they were quickly assimilated by the local Franks, who had always continued to form the majority and by the Baiuvarii.

See also 
 Germania Slavica

External links  

Slavic people in Upper Frankonia 

Medieval Bavaria
West Slavic history
Germany in the Early Middle Ages
History of Franconia